"Higher Window" is singer-songwriter Josh Groban's third single for his fifth studio album Illuminations.

Background
Josh released three singles for his new album. The first single was "Hidden Away," the second single was his first Portuguese song "Voce Existe Em Mim", and the third single, "Higher Window," was released on October 25, 2010. Rick Rubin produced this single along with the previous single "Hidden Away."

Charts

Weekly charts

Year-end charts

Personnel
Vocals – Josh Groban
Record producer – Rick Rubin

Release history

References

External links
Official website

2010 songs
Josh Groban songs
Song recordings produced by Rick Rubin
Songs written by Josh Groban
Reprise Records singles